Lisa Zunshine is an American scholar of literature and Theory of mind, who publishes in eighteenth-century British literature, comparative literature, and cognitive science. She came to the United States as a refugee, from Latvia, when she was twenty-one, and became a U.S. citizen in 1998. She is Bush-Holbrook professor of English at the University of Kentucky, Lexington; a Guggenheim fellow (2007); and author and editor of twelve books, most recently, Getting Inside Your Head: What Cognitive Science Can Tell Us about Popular Culture (Johns Hopkins UP, 2012),The Oxford Handbook of Cognitive Literary Studies (Oxford UP, 2015), and The Secret Life of Literature (MIT Press, 2022).

Books
The Secret Life of Literature. 2022(pdf) (MIT Press Open Access)
Getting Inside Your Head: What Cognitive Science Can Tell Us About Popular Culture. 2012 (pdf)
The Oxford Handbook of Cognitive Literary Studies. 2015
Approaches to Teaching the Works of John Dryden. Co-edited with Jayne Lewis. 2013
Introduction to Cognitive Cultural Studies. 2010
Acting Theory and the English Stage. 2008
Strange Concepts and the Stories They Make Possible: Cognition, Culture, Narrative. 2008 (pdf)
Why We Read Fiction: Theory of Mind and the Novel. 2006 (pdf)
Approaches to Teaching the Novels of Samuel Richardson. Co-edited with Jocelyn Harris. 2006
Philanthropy and Fiction. 2006
Bastards and Foundlings: Illegitimacy in Eighteenth-Century England. 2005   (pdf)
Nabokov at the Limits: Redrawing Critical Boundaries. 1999

References

External links 
 Two Professors Named Guggenheim Fellows
 "Why Fiction Does it Better" The Chronicle of Higher Education
 "Culture of Greedy Mind Readers" Huffington Post
 Homepage

Year of birth missing (living people)
Living people
Literary historians
University of Kentucky faculty
Kentucky women writers
Women literary historians
American women academics
21st-century American women